The Alfa Romeo Tipo 33 was a sports racing prototype raced by the Alfa Romeo factory-backed team between 1967 and 1977. These cars took part for Sport Cars World Championship, Nordic Challenge Cup, Interserie and CanAm series. A small number of road going cars were derived from it in 1967, called Alfa Romeo 33 Stradale.

With the 33TT12 Alfa Romeo won the 1975 World Championship for Makes, and with the 33SC12 the 1977 World Championship for Sports Cars, taking the first place in all eight of the championship races.

Alfa Romeo Tipo 33
 

Alfa Romeo started development of the Tipo 33 in the early 1960s, with the first car being built in 1965. It was sent to Autodelta to be completed and for additional changes to be made. It used a straight-4 engine from the Alfa Romeo TZ2, but Autodelta produced its 2.0 litre V8 soon after. The 2000 cc (122ci) Tipo 33 mid-engined prototype debuted on 12 March 1967 at the Belgian hillclimbing event at Fléron, with Teodoro Zeccoli winning. The first version was nick named the “periscope” type because it had very characteristic air inlet on the roof resembling a periscope objective. It was powered by a 1995 cc (122ci) 90° V8 of 230 hp (201 kW), with a large-diameter tube frame. The original T33 proved unreliable and uncompetitive in the 1967 World Sportscar Championship season, its best result a 5th at the Nürburgring 1000, co-driven by Zeccoli and Roberto Bussinello.

Alfa Romeo T33/2

In 1968, Alfa's subsidiary Autodelta created an evolution model called T33/2. A road version, dubbed Alfa Romeo 33 Stradale, was also introduced. At the 24 Hours of Daytona, the Porsche 907 with 2.2L engines were dominating the overall race, but Alfa took the 2-litre class win, with Udo Schütz and Nino Vaccarella; after that the car was named "Daytona". The win was repeated at the Targa Florio, where Nanni Galli and Ignazio Giunti also took second place overall, followed by teammates Lucien Bianchi and Mario Casoni. Galli and Giunti then won the class at the Nürburgring 1000 km, where the 2.5L version finished for the first time, fourth place in the 3.0L class with Schütz and Bianchi. However, in most races, the Alfa drivers were outclassed by their Porsche rivals who used bigger engines. In 1968, the car was used mainly by privateers, winning its class in the 1000km Monza, Targa Florio and Nürburgring races. At the end of season Alfa Romeo had finished third in the 1968 International Championship for Makes.

A total of 28 cars were built during 1968, allowing the 33/2 to be homologated as a Group 4 Sports Car for 1969.

Alfa Romeo T33/3

The Alfa Romeo T33/3 made its debut in 1969 at the 12 Hours of Sebring. The engine was enlarged to 2998 cc (183ci) with 400 hp (298 kW), which put the T33/3 in the same class as the Porsche 908 and the Ferrari 312P. The chassis was now a monocoque.
The new car did poorly at Sebring and Alfa did not take part in Le Mans after Lucien Bianchi's death in a practice session. The car took a couple of wins in smaller competitions but overall the 1969 season was not a successful one, and Alfa Romeo was placed seventh in the 1969 International Championship for Makes.

In 1970 the bigger 5.0L Porsche 917 and Ferrari 512 dominated, yet Toine Hezemans and Masten Gregory took third overall at Sebring, and Andrea De Adamich and Henri Pescarolo won their class in the 1000km Zeltweg, finishing second overall. Also in 1970, an Alfa T33/3 was one of the "actors" of Steve McQueen's movie Le Mans, released in 1971.In 1971 the Alfa Romeo racing effort was finally successful. Rolf Stommelen and Nanni Galli won their class at the 1000km Buenos Aires (followed by De Adamich and Pescarolo), before taking another class win (and second overall) at Sebring. De Adamich and Pescarolo later won outright at the 1000km Brands Hatch, a significant result against the "invincible" 917s. They then took a class win at Monza (where Alfa Romeo took the three podium slots in the prototype class) and another one at Spa. At the Targa Florio, Vaccarella and Hezemans won outright, followed by teammates De Adamich and Gijs van Lennep. Hezemans and Vaccarella won their class at Zeltweg, and De Adamich and Ronnie Peterson won overall at Watkins Glen. Alfa Romeo finished the season second place in the championship. In 1972 the 5 litre Group 5 Sports Cars were banned and the 3 litre cars of Alfa Romeo, Ferrari and Matra, redesignated as Group 5 Sports Cars, competed together for outright victories.

Alfa Romeo T33/4

A 4-litre version was entered to 1972 and 1974 CanAm series by Otto Zipper, and the driver was Scooter Patrick. Autodelta was also one of entrants with T33/4 in season 1974. The T33/3 version was also used in the CanAm series earlier.

Alfa Romeo T/33/TT/12

The T/33/TT/12 (Telaio Tubolare, tubular chassis) appeared in 1973 with the Carlo Chiti-designed 12 cylinder 3.0L flat engine (500 bhp). The 1973 season was more or less development time and in 1974 the car, which had an F1-style airbox intake added won at Monza 1000 km and finished the season with second place in the championship. It wasn't until 1975 that, after years of trying, Alfa Romeo won the 1975 World Championship for Makes. The season was one of almost total domination with seven wins in eight races., Winning drivers were:  Arturo Merzario, Vittorio Brambilla, Jacques Laffite, Henri Pescarolo, Derek Bell and Jochen Mass. For 1976 Autodelta was concentrating on other
things and the car was rarely used in competitions.

Alfa Romeo 33SC12

The successor of the 33TT12 1976 was the 33SC12, SC referring to SCatolato, a boxed chassis. The 3.0 L flat-12 engine now produced . With this car Alfa Romeo won the 1977 World Championship for Sports Cars, the 33SC12s driven by Arturo Merzario, Jean-Pierre Jarier and Vittorio Brambilla having won every race in the series. The SC12 Turbo was Alfa's first twin turbocharged 12 cylinder engine and it was introduced around the same time as Renault's Formula One turbo engine. In the Alfa Romeo engine each bank was fed with its own turbocharger; that feature was adopted by many racecar makers in the following years.

The flat-12 engine was later used on Brabham-Alfa BT45, BT46 and Alfa Romeo 177 F1 cars.

Audio

References

External links
 Alfa Romeo T33, striking example for the use of Rosso Corsa
 Alfa Website also with Racing with History 
 World Sportscar Championship 1968 results
 World Sportscar Championship 1977 results
 World Sportscar Championship 1975 results
 1972 Racing season Alfa vs. Ferrari 
  Can-Am Championship results

Tipo 033
Sports prototypes
Cars powered by boxer engines
Can-Am cars
24 Hours of Le Mans race cars
Group 4 (racing) cars
Winner